Anexophana is a monotypic snout moth genus. It was described by Pierre Viette in 1960 and contains the species A. robinsonalis. It is found on Madagascar.

References

Epipaschiinae
Monotypic moth genera
Moths of Madagascar
Pyralidae genera